Clintonism refers to the political and economic policies of Bill Clinton and Hillary Rodham Clinton, as well as the era of his presidency in the United States.

The Democratic Leadership Council, a pro-Democratic Party establishment, argues that Clintonism "stands for economic growth and opportunity; for fiscal responsibility; for work, not welfare; for preventing crime and punishing criminals; and for non-bureaucratic, empowering government" and further says that "these policies are key to the successes in the beginning of the 21st century."

On the other hand, some critics of Clinton associate Clintonism with "coddling big money (except guns and tobacco), financial scandals, winning at any cost, flip-flopping and prevaricating".

Characteristics 

Clintonism refers to the centrist or neoliberal wing of the United States Democratic Party centered on former President Bill Clinton and his wife, former First Lady, Senator, Secretary of State and 2016 Democratic nominee Hillary Clinton, both in their times in office and subsequently. It is also thought to encompass many other prominent people, including campaign consultant Dick Morris, journalist Sidney Blumenthal, Democratic National Committee Chairman Steven Grossman, politician and governor Bill Richardson, Secretary of Housing and Urban Development Henry Cisneros, Treasury Department Secretary Robert Rubin and Secretary of State Madeleine Albright.

While the primary qualification is being aligned with or part of the inner circle associated with the Clintons, the ideology can be said in broad outline to favor certain policies:
 Free trade : an essential component of his economic policy, Clinton worked to pass the NAFTA and create the World Trade Organization. 
 Balanced budget: Clintonism is associated with restraining the growth of federal spending in order to allow lower interest rates and freer monetary policy.
 Greater willingness to use and fund the military
 A  willingness to compromise on social issues such as abortion and LGBT rights. Bill Clinton signed the 1996 Defense of Marriage Act, although it was struck down by the Supreme Court and repealed by the 2022 Respect for Marriage Act.
 Reform or reduction of some government programs, exemplified by the ending of Aid to Families with Dependent Children as part of welfare reform.
 Internationalism, particularly the expansion of NATO.

The ideology is sometimes thought of as part of the Third Way, a brand of politics that is said to include (at the time or since) Prime Minister Tony Blair's New Labour in the United Kingdom, the Liberal Party in Canada and the Social Democratic Party in Germany under Chancellor Gerhard Schröder. According to Vanity Fair, Clintonism is foundationally "based on the baby boomer credo that you truly can have it all".

See also 
 Hillaryland
 Political positions of Hillary Clinton
 Third Way

References

External links 
 The New York Times cover story on Clintonism

Bill Clinton
Hillary Clinton
Presidency of Bill Clinton
American political neologisms
Democratic Party (United States)
Liberalism in the United States
Centrism in the United States
Eponymous political ideologies
Political positions of presidents of the United States
Political positions of state governors of the United States